Schenker may refer to:

Companies
 Schenker AG, German logistics company
 DB Schenker, division of German rail operator Deutsche Bahn

People

 Alexander M. Schenker (born 1924), American Slavist
 Gottfried Schenker (1842–1901), founder of Schenker AG
 H. R. Schenker (1882–1922), American football coach
 Heinrich Schenker (1868–1935), Austrian music theorist
 Michael Schenker (born 1955), German guitarist, founding member of the band Scorpions and member of the band UFO
 Rudolf Schenker (born 1948), German guitarist, founding member of the band Scorpions
 Uwe Schwenker (born 1959), German handball player 
 Zoltán Ozoray Schenker (1880–1966), Hungarian Olympic champion saber fencer